Ahmed Yousef Abdel Qader Mohammed Al Ansari (born in 1967) is a Bahraini politician, banker, and trade unionist. He has been in the Council of Representatives since winning a seat in the 2010 Bahraini general election.

Biography		
Al Ansari is descended from the Banu Aws and Banu Khazraj tribes of Medina. He obtained a high school diploma.

In the 2010 election, he ran for the Council of Representatives in the Seventh District of the Central Governorate for the Al Asalah Islamic Society, a Sunni Salafist party. He received 2,868 votes in the first round for 53.40%.

In the 2014 Bahraini general election, he ran for the Third District of the Southern Governorate. He won 3,087 votes for 53.01% in the first round.
	
In the 2018 Bahraini general election, he ran again for the same constituency as in 2014, this time winning 3,784 votes for 54.90% in the first round on November 24.

References	

Members of the Council of Representatives (Bahrain)
Bahraini people of Iranian descent
1967 births
Living people